Janet Echelman (born March 19, 1966) is an American sculptor and fiber artist. Her sculptures have been displayed as public art, often as site-specific installations.

Works include: 1.26, which has been exhibited on five continents; Her Secret Is Patience in downtown Phoenix; Water Sky Garden which premiered for the 2010 Vancouver Winter Olympics; She Changes on the waterfront in Porto, Portugal; and Every Beating Second at San Francisco International Airport.

Recipient of a Guggenheim Fellowship, Echelman was named an Architectural Digest 2012 Innovator for "changing the very essence of urban spaces." Echelman's artwork has been reviewed in The New York Times, Newsweek, Time, and was selected for Architectural Digest's "Innovators". She currently serves on the Harvard Board of Overseers.

Early life and education
Janet Echelman was born in Tampa, Florida in 1966. Her father is an endocrinologist, and her mother a jewelry designer. She graduated from Harvard University in 1987.

Career
Echelman traveled to Hong Kong on a Rotary International Fellowship to study Chinese brush painting and calligraphy. She later returned to Harvard University as an artist-in-residence and was given an old squash court to use as her studio. In 1997, Echelman won a Fulbright Senior Lectureship and traveled to India with the intention of giving painting exhibitions. Her artistic supplies were lost in transit to Mahabalipuram, so she began working with local bronze-casters but the material was heavy and too expensive for her budget. While watching fishermen bundling their nets, Echelman was inspired to take a new approach to sculpture, creating volumetric form without heavy, solid materials. In collaboration with the fishermen, Echelman created a series of netted sculptures, her "Bellbottoms" series.

Echelman has developed aerial sculptures into  structures machine-woven from polytetrafluoroethylene (PTFE) and ultra-high-molecular-weight polyethylene (UHMWPE) and suspended from skyscrapers. The lightweight surfaces of these sculptures shift and ripple with air currents, an effect which may be enhanced with projected light and fans; these are often installed so the audience may interact with the sculpture, reinforcing Echelman's theme of interconnectedness.

Major works

Museum exhibitions

1.8 Renwick 

1.8 Renwick is a sculpture commissioned by the Smithsonian American Art Museum for the reopening of the Renwick Gallery in Washington, D.C. after a 2 year long renovation. The renovation aimed to transform the Renwick Gallery into an interactive art space, creating an immersive experience for visitors. 1.8 Renwick hung in the Grand Salon of the Renwick Gallery from November 2015 to June 2017  and was the site First Lady Michelle Obama brought a Nordic delegation to introduce them to Contemporary American Art. The large net sculpture was part of the museum's Wonder exhibition from November 13, 2015 until July 10, 2016, but was later acquired by the Renwick Gallery for their permanent collection and stayed on view in the Grand Salon until May 21, 2017.  Its re-installation in 2020 was lauded by the Washington Post's art critic with the print headline "Paradise Found - Again" (online headline "A hugely popular hit returns to the Renwick"), and it has been extended into 2023.  The piece is part of Echelman's Earthtime Series, and  1.8 Renwick was custom designed to fit the space of the Grand Salon. The number in the title referring to the measurement of time the earth's day shortened in response to a shifting of the earth's crust. In addition to the hundred-foot-long piece suspended above the Grand Salon, Echelman designed a 4,000 square foot textile flooring with a pattern which matched the topography of the sculpture above. 1.8 Renwick turned the Grand Salon into one large immersive piece of art. On the floor, furniture was arranged to invite viewers to lie down and get lost in the layers of twine above.

Permanent public installations

Where We Met 
Installed in 2016, this monumental aerial net sculpture measures 200 by 130 feet (61 m × 40 m) and is suspended over the Great Lawn of LeBauer City Park in downtown Greensboro, North Carolina. It has been called the largest outdoor art installation in the Southeast. The design is inspired by the city's textile industry and the six railroad lines that intersected there, bringing people together.

Impatient Optimist 

Installed in 2015, Impatient Optimist was commissioned by the Bill and Melinda Gates foundation for their global campus in downtown Seattle that opened in 2011. The netted piece is designed to represent the importance of individuals and connect all of the regional campuses of the foundation across the globe. The structure of the piece is inspired by what Echelman and her team were able to visually represent as "the shape of a day". By taking pictures of the Seattle sky every five minutes for a full 24 hour period, the Studio analyzed the color data of the picture sequence and graphed it radially. This is their shape of a Seattle day. Utilizing pre-programmed lighting sequences, at night, the sculpture echoes the sunrise in each of the foundation's global offices in real time.

Every Beating Second 

Within the renovated Terminal 2 of San Francisco International Airport, this 40-foot (12 m) sculptural installation of colored netting hangs below three round skylights. During the day, the shadow of the sculpture interplays with a shaded outline of the shadow that would occur at the summer solstice. At night, the sculpture is lit with programmed color lighting. Fans animate the sculpture throughout the day.

The title of the sculpture is from a line by beat poet Allen Ginsberg in his poem Howl, which he wrote in San Francisco. Visually, the sculpture evokes the contours and colors of cloud formations over San Francisco Bay and hints at the silhouette of the Golden Gate Bridge. Aesthetically, the sculpture looks both backwards and forwards, drawing its color from the heyday of psychedelic music, the Summer of Love, and San Francisco's prominence in the beat poetry movement, while also referencing the contemporary bay area as a hub of innovation and interconnectivity for the world of technology.

Water Sky Garden 

Put on display beginning in 2009, Water Sky Garden is a contemplative art environment at the plaza surrounding the Richmond Olympic Oval, a legacy of the 2010 Vancouver Olympic Winter Games. Red-stained cedar boardwalks lead visitors through the artwork. Water-purifying aerators draw shapes with bubbles on the surface of a pond that collects runoff water from the Oval's 5-acre roof, while suspended net sculptures undulate overhead in the wind, becoming sky-lanterns with nighttime illumination.

Her Secret Is Patience 

Finished in 2009, this 145-foot-tall (44 m) aerial net sculpture is suspended over Civic Space Park in Phoenix, Arizona. Nighttime illumination colors change gradually through the seasons, from blues in the summer to reds in the winter. The title quotes poet Waldo Emerson: "Adopt the pace of nature; her secret is patience."

She Changes 

Installed at the Praça da Cidade do Salvador, Porto, Portugal in 2005, this sculpture is composed of an aerial net sculpture hanging from a 45-metre (148 ft) steel ring on three steel support poles. The city has made the sculpture its graphic symbol and residents give different interpretations of the work, from fishing nets, ships and masts of maritime history, to smokestacks of the industrial past, to Portuguese lace, sea creatures, and ripples in water.

Temporary public installations

As If It Were Already Here 

Commissioned by the Greenway Conservancy's Public Art Program, As If It Were Already Here was suspended over the Rose Kennedy Greenway in Boston, MA from May through October 2015. The netted sculpture was 245 feet long and tethered to surrounding skyscrapers. The piece's design represented the history of the space that it was suspended across. Three voids in the sculpture recalled the history of the "Tri-Mountain" which once existed in its spot but was flattened in the 18th century to allow for more flat land near the harbor. Six colorful stripes across the piece represented the six lanes of traffic of the highway that used to occupy the space of the greenway before the infamous "Big-Dig" that relocated the highway underground. In 2023, the Boston Society of Architects awarded the work its Harleston Parker Medal, which recognizes “the most beautiful piece of architecture, building, monument, or structure built in the metropolitan Boston area in the past 10 years”.

Skies Painted with Unnumbered Sparks 

An aerial sculpture created for the TED (Technology, Entertainment, Design) conference's 30th anniversary in March 2014, suspended between the Vancouver Convention Centre and a 30-story building. For this piece, Echelman collaborated with the Google Creative Lab's Creative Director of the Data Arts team, Aaron Koblin. The sculpture spanned 745 feet across the Vancouver sky. Viewers were able to connect to the lighting program and interact with the monumental netted sculpture with their smartphones.

The Space Between Us 

Echelman was commissioned to build one of her famous aerial net sculptures for a special one-night-only light festival, GLOW, in Santa Monica on the night of September 28, 2013.  The sculpture included shaped beach and an audio program to fully immerse visitors in the piece.  Viewers were able to experience a different world when they stepped inside the world that Echelman and her sculpture created. More than 150,000 people attended and experienced the sculpture during the one night of the festival.  The New York Times credited Echelman's work for "giving crafts a coolly conceptual edge."

The experience of creating this sculpture marked a point of change for Echelman. "The beach is the charged zone between human society and uncontrolled nature," she said. "I'm interested in sculpting earth and sky, and placing ourselves in between. It's the collision of heaviness and lightness, between our gravity-bound bodies which walk on sand, and the part of us which seeks to float in air, or in water."

1.26 

1.26 is a  aerial sculpture originally created for the City of Denver's Biennial of the Americas celebration in July 2010. The city requested a large-yet-temporary work exploring the theme of interconnectedness of the 35 nations of the Western Hemisphere. Its form was inspired by data sets of the tsunami's wave height rippling across the Pacific Ocean.

Unable to use a steel armature, as in her previous permanent commissions, a UHMWPE support structure was developed. This resulted in a lightweight, low-impact design which could be temporarily attached to existing architectural structures, and also allowed the sculpture to better respond to the wind. The fluidly moving form of the sculpture contrasts with the rigid architectural surfaces, and at night darkness conceals the support cables while colored lighting creates the appearance of a floating luminous form.

Its first installation was in downtown Colorado, suspended from the roof of the seven-story Denver Art Museum. It has since traveled to exhibitions on five continents: Sydney's Art & About Festival (2011); the Amsterdam Light Festival (2012–13); Singapore (2014); Montreal (2015); the Signal Festival in Prague (October 2015); the Lumiere festival in Durham, England (November 2015); and Santiago, Chile (2016).

1.8 

1.8 is a large aerial net sculpture which undulates in the wind and weather. It can be transported and installed for exhibitions, tethered to existing architecture. At night, colored light is projected onto the sculpture and can be altered via smartphone app by the viewing public, creating interacting ripples of color.

The sculpture's title refers to the period in microseconds that the day was shortened as a result of the 2011 Tōhoku earthquake and tsunami, and its form was inspired by data sets of the tsunami's wave height rippling across the Pacific Ocean. The artwork attempts to relate the audience's complex interdependencies with larger cycles of time and the physical world, its structure a physical manifestation of interconnectedness, as every element effects every other.

1.8 premiered at the January 2016 Lumiere festival in London, where it was installed 180 feet (55 m) over the busy pedestrian area of Oxford Circus. Its first showing in the United States was at San Diego's Embarcadero Marina Park South for the 2016 Adobe MAX Creativity Conference.

Personal life
Echelman is married to David Feldman and they have two children.

Awards 

Public Art Network's Year in Review Award (2005, 2010, 2015, 2017)
Tuft's University Honorary Doctorate of Fine Arts (2016)
United States Artists Fellowship (2016)
Smithsonian magazine's American Ingenuity Award, Visual Arts (2014)
Architectural Digest magazine's Innovator (2012)
John Simon Guggenheim Memorial Foundation, Fellowship in Fine Arts (2011–12)
Harvard University Loeb Fellowship (2007–08, 2012–13)
Fulbright Senior Lectureship in Visual Art (1997, extended 1997–98)

References

1966 births
Living people
Harvard University alumni
American women sculptors
Artists from Tampa, Florida
Henry Crown Fellows
21st-century American women artists
21st-century American sculptors
20th-century American women artists
20th-century American sculptors
Sculptors from Florida